The Ecologist Party "The Greens" (PEV) is a Portuguese eco-socialist political party. It is a member of the European Greens and a founding member of the European Federation of Green Parties.

It was the first Portuguese ecologist party, and since its foundation, in 1982, PEV has had a close relationship with the Portuguese Communist Party (PCP). From 1987 onwards, it entered all the legislative, and municipal elections as part of Unitary Democratic Coalition, which also includes the PCP. Between 1983 and 1987, PEV was part of the United People Alliance, to which the PCP also belonged. For this reason, PEV is often criticized for being an "appendage" of the PCP. People who expressed that opinion include former prime minister José Sócrates.

PEV holds many mandates in local assemblies, but, following the January 2022 election, it lost its parliamentary representation.

History and general information 
The Party was founded 1982, originally named the Portuguese Ecologist Movement – Party "The Greens"  (Movimento Ecologista Português – Partido "Os Verdes"), by a group of Portuguese citizens interested in the promotion of the ecologist movement in Portuguese society, with the support of the Portuguese Communist Party, including in its founders one of its members, Zita Seabra.

In the end of the 1970s, Earth was facing new ecological problems, such as the greenhouse effect and the depletion of the ozone layer and the lack of awareness of this in Portuguese society, along with the lack of an organized Ecologist movement, led to the foundation of the Ecologist Party "The Greens" in order to put such problems on the political agenda.

The Party created regional groups immediately following its foundation, groups that have continued to grow since then. The growth of the Party throughout the country allowed many members to integrate the electoral lists of the CDU, some being elected to very different tasks. Currently, The PEV has several members elected in Municipal Chambers, in Municipal Assemblies and in Parish Assemblies, but it has no members elected in the Assembly of the Republic (Portuguese parliament). There is some criticism of its close ties to the Communist Party. Given that PEV never stood in elections on its own, some right-wing politicians have gone to the point of nicknaming PEV "The Watermelons – Greens Outside, Reds Inside". However, the official positions of both parties on certain questions can be quite different, of which the stance regarding bullfighting is an example.

The PEV is also present in the National Electoral Commission and also in the National Council of Education.
The youth wing of the Party is the Ecolojovem, founded in 1989, which is a founding member of the Federation of Young European Greens.

The PEV edits a newspaper, the Folha Verde (Green Leaf), which received several press prizes for its unique design and style.

The PEV supported the minority Socialist Costa Government (2015–2019) with a confidence and supply agreement.

In the 2022 legislative elections, the PEV lost its remaining parliamentary representation.

Electoral results 

In elections, the PEV is closely allied with the Portuguese Communist Party, first in the Unitary Democratic Coalition. This explains a nickname given to Os Verdes by some: "melancias" (lit. watermelons): green outside and red inside. The "green" here is a reference to the self-proclaimed ecologist nature of the party, while "red" means "communist".

Results in parliamentary elections 

Note:

 In brackets is the number of MPs elected by the PEV in the total elected by CDU.
 In 1991 the overall number of MPs changed from the original 250 to 230. Results in local elections 

 European Parliament These are the results for Unitary Democratic Coalition.Note:

 In 2004, after the enlargement of the European Union, the number of MEPs elected by Portugal decreased from the original 25 to 24, and in 2009 it further decreased to 22.''

See also 

Green party
Green politics
Politics of Portugal
List of environmental organizations
List of political parties in Portugal
Unitary Democratic Coalition

References

External links 
Official web site 
Info on EFGP site 
PEV website in the Lisbon Municipal Assembly 

1982 establishments in Portugal
Ecosocialist parties
European Green Party
Global Greens member parties
Green parties in Europe
Organisations based in Lisbon
Political parties established in 1982
Political parties in Portugal
Socialist parties in Portugal